Shada or SHADA may refer to:

Shada (Doctor Who), an unaired serial of Doctor Who
USS Shada (SP-580), a United States Navy patrol vessel 
Sexual Health and Disability Alliance
Société Haitiano-Américaine de Développement Agricole, a Haiti–United States agricultural venture
Jada Shada Hudson, Haitian-Canadian drag queen

See also
Shadda, an emphasis symbol in the Arabic alphabet
Şada, a village in Azerbaijan